Semper may refer to:

Mottos
Semper Montani Liberi (Mountaineers Are Always Free) West Virginia
 Semper supra (Latin: Always above), the official motto of the United States Space Force
 Semper fidelis (Latin: Always faithful), a motto used by, among others, the United States Marine Corps
 Semper fortis (Latin: Always courageous), an unofficial motto of the United States Navy
 Semper gumby (Dog Latin: Always flexible), an unofficial motto of the USCG, USMC, USPHS, CAP, Emergency Management and more
 Semper maior (Latin: Always more, always greater), a motto of Ignatius of Loyola, the founder of the Jesuits
 Semper paratus (Latin: Always ready), the United States Coast Guard motto
 Semper primus (always first), a latin phrase used as a motto by several United States and Israeli military units
 Semper vigilans (always vigilant), a latin phrase used as a motto by the Civil Air Patrol, several military units, and the city of San Diego, California, U.S.
 Semper vigilo (Latin: Always vigilant or Always alert), motto of Police Scotland
 Sic semper tyrannis (Latin: Thus always to tyrants), motto of Virginia
 Quas dederis solas semper habebis opes (Latin: "What thou hast given alone shall be eternal riches unto thee"), motto of Queen Mary's Grammar School, England

People 
 Carl Semper (1832–1893), German ethnologist and animal ecologist
 Colin Semper (born 1938), Anglican priest
 Georg Semper (1837–1909), German entomologist
 Gottfried Semper (1803–1879), German architect, art critic, and professor of architecture
 Johannes Semper (1892–1970), Estonian writer and translator
 John Semper, American screenwriter, producer and story editor
 Manfred Semper, German architect of the second Dresden Opera House and son of Gottfried Semper
 Natalya Yevgenevna Semper (1911–1995), Soviet memoirist and Egyptologist
 Trevor Semper (born 1970), Montserratian cricketer

Other uses
 Semper (food brand), Swedish brand of infant food, a member of Hero Group
 "Semper I", 2011 episode of the psychological thriller TV series Homeland
 Semperoper, an opera house in Dresden, Germany
 Semper (Property Management System), Hotel Software company based in South Africa

See also
 Ea Semper, 1907 apostolic letter written by Pope Pius X
 Semper fi (disambiguation)
 Semper fidelis (disambiguation)